Transmission was a literary magazine in the United Kingdom. Transmission is a non-profit publication, and everybody involved in its production is a volunteer. It was published three times a year, and ceased publication in 2008.

History
Transmission was founded in 2004 by Dan McTiernan and Graham Foster. Printed in Manchester, it was originally chiefly concerned with finding and championing unpublished authors from the North of England. However, as the magazine grew in popularity it began to accept submissions from all over the UK (although it still remains loyal to Manchester). Since its launch, it has featured short stories and interviews with a range of notable literary figures including Doris Lessing, Toby Litt and (in September 2006) Dave Eggers.

The magazine has been largely praised for combining a literary content with striking design. From the first issue, the design has been overseen by Jo Phillips. In 2006 Transmission began to hand-print its front covers, the design of which is conducted by Edwin Pickstone at the Glasgow School of Art. In January 2006, Dan McTiernan left the magazine to pursue other interests, leaving Graham Foster as the sole editor. In October 2006, Transmission sponsored events at both The Times Cheltenham Literature Festival and the Manchester Literature Festival. In Cheltenham,  Transmission was the sponsor of a reading by Marina Warner, and in Manchester the magazine sponsored a talk by Palestinian novelist Samir El Youssef.

Interviews
Transmission has interviewed: Doris Lessing, Edmund White, Sarah Waters, Andrew Biswell, Toby Litt, A. L. Kennedy, Douglas Coupland, Dave Eggers, Paul Magrs,
Jon McGregor, Haruki Murakami, John Banville, Nicola Monaghan, Chuck Palahniuk, Michael Chabon, Christopher Brookmyre, Fiona Campbell, Wesley Stace, Rose Tremain, Colm Toibin, Dan Vyleta, and Empar Moliner

Articles
Transmission features very varied articles of a literary basis in every issue. Articles have ranged from a behind-the-scenes look at the Royal Exchange Theatre in Manchester to a feature on two of Britain's leading literary festivals. The magazine has also examined the meaning of death in the novel and written about Douglas Coupland's debut stage play, September 10th 2001. In a regular section, entitled "Writer's Block", literary professionals offer writing guidance. Notable contributors to this section include novelists Paul Magrs, Ian McGuire and Ray Robinson. Publishers such as Comma Press's Ra Page and Carcanet's Michael Schmidt have also written articles for this section.

Short fiction
Transmission was founded in order to publish short fiction from unpublished writers. In each issue, the fiction is based around a theme, some of which have been "Identity", "Nature" and "Time". These themes are broad and have been interpreted in a variety of ways by featured writers. Each issue also includes a "Micro-Fiction" section, which consists of short stories that are under 500 words in length. Every story is illustrated by up-and-coming illustrators, providing the magazine with its own look.

Plaudits
 "A well-judged balance of fiction, interviews and articles - reading it feels like it might do you a favour, not the other way round." (City Life)
 "touching" "entertaining" and "pulls off one of the hardest tricks in fiction..." (Time Out)
 In 2006 Transmission won the Incwriters Magazine Award for outstanding contribution to literature.

External links
 Transmission homepage
 Interview with Graham Foster
 Guardian review (July 2006)

2004 establishments in the United Kingdom
2008 disestablishments in the United Kingdom
Defunct literary magazines published in the United Kingdom
Magazines established in 2004
Magazines disestablished in 2008
Magazines published in Manchester
Triannual magazines published in the United Kingdom